Pine Island is a small island in Carp Lake in the Peace River watershed, about 100 km north of Prince George in the province of British Columbia, Canada.

References

Lake islands of British Columbia
Uninhabited islands of British Columbia